World War II Combat: Iwo Jima is a budget-priced first-person shooter developed by Direct Action Games and published by Groove Games.

Gameplay
The game consists of ten missions, three of which take place in Saipan and the rest on Iwo Jima. In each mission, the player must complete a number of objectives to progress. The player is equipped with four weapons including a pistol, a secondary firearm, an explosive weapon and a knife (which can be upgraded to a flamethrower in some missions). Restocking on bullets requires the player to search bodies and places as well as occasional ammunition pickups. The player can also try to collect three hidden "Souvenirs" in every mission, which if collected will allow the player to access trivial history and war documentary footage. The Xbox version supports up to four players in Split screen mode.

Development 
The game's composer, Alex Guilbert, also acted as an audio director and provided voice acting for the title, receiving top billing in the game's credits.

Reception

Like its predecessor, World War II Combat: Road to Berlin, it received extremely negative reviews from reviewers and users alike. It suffered from many of the same problems of the first game.

The game received "generally unfavorable reviews" on both platforms according to the review aggregation website Metacritic.

See also
World War II Combat: Road to Berlin

References

External links

2006 video games
Unreal Engine games
Video games developed in the United States
Video games set in Japan
Video games set in the Northern Mariana Islands
Pacific War video games
Windows games
World War II first-person shooters
Xbox games
Groove Games games
Multiplayer and single-player video games